Eve's Ribs is an annual feminist festival and collective in Saint Petersburg. The festival's coordinator is the theatre director and activist Vera Boitcova. The collective also maintains a center, hosting lectures, exhibitions and other themed evenings throughout the year.

In 2019 police turned up at the festival, after a complaint by anti-gay activist Timur Bulatov, and insisted on monitoring the presence of minors at the festival.

The Eve's Rib building hosts a women-only coworking space throughout the day. The collective has also published two books of fairytales, 'Fairytales for Girls'.

References

External links
 Women of Eve's Ribs

Feminist organizations in Russia
Feminism and the arts
Festivals in Saint Petersburg